The Romanian government is the armiger in Romania. It exercises this right under the mandatory advice of the National Committee of Heraldry, Genealogy and Sigillography. The committee is subordinate to the Romanian Academy. All the coats of arms of Romanian institutions must be approved by this committee with two exceptions. The Romanian military is subject to the Ministry of National Defense Heraldric Committee, and Romanian law enforcement institutions are subject to the Ministry of Administration and Interior Heraldric Committee. Both of these committees may share members with the National Committee of Heraldry, Genealogy and Sigillography.

Romanian coats of arms

Mediaeval voivodeships and states

States of the early modern period 
The coats of arms of the early modern period represent the states of Romania from about the 15th century to about the 19th century.

States of the modern period

The United Principalities of Moldavia and Wallachia 1859–1866 
After the election of Alexandru Ioan Cuza as Domnitor of Wallachia and Moldavia, the heraldic symbols of the two countries were united to form the coat of arms of the new state. In 1862, this new state was named Romania. However, the idea was not new. Most of the Phanariotes used united symbols in their personal coat of arms to show that they held power in both countries. Until 1866, there was no official design of the coat of arms of Romania, although the painter, Carol Popp de Szathmary, created some draft designs.

Romania 1866–1878 
After 10 May 1866, (when Carol I came to Romania), and the Constitution of 1 June 1866 was founded, the coat of arms of Romania was established. It used concepts found in previous coats of arms. From 1872, the coat of arms represented the Kingdom of Romania. In 1878, when Romania gained independence, the coat of arms was changed again.

Kingdom of Romania

1872–1921 
In 1872, the heraldic symbols of Oltenia and the Black Sea coast were added to the Romanian coat of arms. In 1881, the symbol of Dobrudja was added and its aspect was slightly changed.

1922–1947 
After World War I, Transylvania, Bessarabia, Banat, and Bukovina united with the Kingdom of Romania. As a result, symbols representing the new territories were added to the coat of arms.

Communist Romania

People's Republic of Romania 
After 1948, the Communist authorities changed both the flag and the coat of arms. The coat of arms became more emblematically faithful to Communist symbolism: a landscape (depicting a rising sun, a tractor and an oil drill) surrounded by stocks of wheat tied together with a cloth in the colors of the national flag. Between 1948 and 1966, there were three variants. The first came shortly after 1948 (the proclamation of the republic). The next was in 1952 when a red star was added.

Socialist Republic of Romania 
The final change to the communist emblem took place in 1966 when Romania ceased to be a People's Republic, and became a Socialist Republic. At this time, the wording changed from  R. P. R. to Republica Socialista Romania.

Romania

1989–1992
Immediately after the fall of Nicolae Ceaușescu and the communist regime, the communist emblem was removed from all flags, and official seals. Some flags had a hole (a symbol of the revolution) and some changed to the later official blue-yellow-red format.

During this period, Romania had no de jure national emblem although the socialist emblem continued to be in use until 1992; however, 10-lei coins issued in this period bore a de facto emblem showing a wreath of olive overlaid on the Romanian Flag where the coat of arms would be located on later coins.

1992–present 

In 1992, the Parliament of Romania adopted a new coat of arms. Two models, both inspired by the coat of arms of the Kingdom of Romania, were merged to achieve the final result.

In April 2016, deputies of the Judiciary Committee endorsed a bill voted previously by the Senate that returns the crown on the head of the eagle and mandates the public authorities to replace the existing emblems and seals to those provided by law until 31 December 2018 (to mark the centenary of the Union of Transylvania with Romania on 1 December 1918). The bill was adopted by the Chamber of Deputies on 8 June 2016 and promulgated by President Klaus Iohannis on 11 July 2016.

Historic Romanian regions and provinces

Marmatia

Crisana

Banat Region

Transylvania

Wallachian Region
In the Middle Ages, Wallachia had two core provinces. One was Greater Wallachia (Muntenia) and the other was Lesser Walachia (Oltenia). There was also the disputed province of Dobruja. These provinces were mostly geographical, not administrative, but from the end of the 15th century, because the Banate of Severin was partitioned between Wallachia and the Kingdom of Hungary, Oltenia was ruled by a ban. Oltenia was known as the Banate of Craiova.
It is unknown whether the Despotate of Dobruja originally had a coat of arms. Control of the region over time involved Romania, Bulgaria and the Ottoman Empire. The present coat of arms of Dobruja was created in 1872. Also in 1872, a new form of the Wallachia coat of arms was officiated to represent just Muntenia. In the Middle Ages, Muntenia had had a different heraldic symbol.

Moldovan Region
In the Middle Ages, Moldova had four provinces: three permanent provinces, The Upper Country, The Lower Country and Basarabia, and a disputed province, Pokuttya. Moldova lay between the Ottoman Empire, the Austrian empire and the Russian Empire. The Upper Country (the northwestern part) was occupied by Austrians, who named the land Bucovina. The Lower Country (eastern part) was conquered by the Russian Empire. It was merged with Basarabia, forming the Guberniya of Bessarabia. The remaining portion was preserved as Moldova. In the 17th century, Transnistria was governed by the Principality of Moldova but was never a part of it. Today, the western part of Transnistria is in the Republic of Moldavia while the rest is in Ukraine, as is most of Bugeac (north of Bucovina) and Pocutia.

Coats of arms of local authorities

Coats of arms of the counties in the interwar period (1926–1938 and 1940–1947)

Coats of arms of the ținuturi (lands) between 1938 and 1940

Coats of arms of the counties

Coats of arms of the county seats 
The coats of arms of the county seats are distinguished from those of the urban entities by the absence of a mural crown present in the latter. The crown has an odd number of towers (one, three, five or seven), depending on the importance of the urban entity.

Coats of arms of central institutions

Parliament 
The Parliament of Romania does not hold a coat of arms, as it does not function as a whole entity. When a law is published in the Official Gazette of Romania, it is headed by the coat of arms of Romania. The two houses of the Parliament of Romania issue documents that are not laws. These documents bear the coat of arms of the issuing house. The coat of arms of the Senate of Romania is the Coat of arms of Romania surrounded by two olive branches which are tied together with a cloth in the colors of the Flag of Romania. On the yellow section it reads Senat, and on top of the coat of arms it reads Romania. The coat of arms of the Chamber of Deputies of Romania reproduces the eagle of the Coat of arms of Romania surrounded by two olive branches tied together with a golden cloth. Beneath the eagle it reads Camera Deputatilor, and beneath the olive branches it reads Romania.

Ministries

Former coats of arms

Heraldry of the Ministry of Administration and Interior 
In 2008, the Ministry of Administration and Interior decided to allow the units of the Inspectorates in its structure to use coats of arms. This decision applied to the County Inspectorates of Police, County Inspectorates of the Gendarmerie, County Inspectorates of the Border Police, County Inspectorates of the General Inspectorate for Emergency Situations, Units and educational institutions of the Gendarmerie, Schools of the Police, central units and institutions of the Ministry of Administration and Interior. Gradual introduction of these coats of arms began in 2010. Prior to this decision, the Inspectorates in the Ministry were permitted to use their own coats of arms at the national and local levels. The coats of arms of all the institutions of the Ministry are administered by the Ministry's Heraldic Commission, and not by the committee of National Heraldry, Sealography, and Genealogy.

Police heraldry

Gendarmerie heraldry

Other law enforcement authorities

Heraldry of the Romanian Armed Forces 
Since the 18th century, the symbol of the Romanian Army has been a golden crossed aquila, with red claws and beak, standing on Zeus's thunderbolt. All the military coats of arms are created starting with this main element. Different ranks of units in the military hierarchy are distinguished by the shape of the shield. The coats of arms of all the institutions of the Ministry of Defense are designed by the Ministry's Geraldric Commission.

Secret services

See also 

 Mottos of Romanian institutions

References

Romanian heraldry
Romania